Victor Zednick (December 25, 1884 – April 15, 1959) was an American politician in the state of Washington. He served in the Washington House of Representatives and Washington State Senate.

References

1884 births
1959 deaths
Republican Party members of the Washington House of Representatives
Politicians from Denver
20th-century American politicians
Republican Party Washington (state) state senators